Trout Creek is a hamlet within the town of Tompkins in Delaware County, New York, United States. Trout Creek has a post office with ZIP code 13847, which opened on June 21, 1847.

References

Hamlets in Delaware County, New York
Hamlets in New York (state)